Barbara Buczek (9 January 1940 – 17 January 1993) was a Polish composer. She was born in Kraków, Poland.

Partial list of works
Mikrosonata for violin solo (1968)
Blaeserquintett (1969) 
Anekumena – Concerto for 89 instruments (1974)
Eidos III for bassoon solo (1979)
String Quartet No. 2 Transgressio (1985)
Study No. 1 for flute solo (1990)

External links
Biography, photo and list of works (in Polish)

1940 births
1993 deaths
Polish composers
20th-century composers
Polish women composers